Dancing at the Edge of the World is a 1989 nonfiction collection by Ursula K. Le Guin.

The works are divided into two categories: talks and essays, and book and movie reviews. Within the categories, the works are organized chronologically, and are further marked by what Le Guin calls the Guide Ursuline—a system of symbols denoting the main theme of the works. The four themes with which she categorizes the essays are feminism, social responsibility, literature and travel.

Contents

Talks and Essays
 1976: "The Space Crone" (feminism, social responsibility)
 1976: "Is Gender Necessary? Redux" (literature, feminism)
 1978: "Moral and Ethical Implications of Family Planning" (feminism, social responsibility)
 1979: "It Was a Dark and Stormy Night" (literature)
 1979: "Working on 'The Lathe'" (literature)
 1980: "Some Thoughts on Narrative" (literature)
 1981: "World-Making" (literature)
 1981: "Hunger" (social responsibility)
 1981: "Places Names" (travel)
 1982: "The Princess" (social responsibility, feminism)
 1982: "A Non-Euclidean View of California as a Cold Place to Be" (literature)
 1982: "Facing It" (social responsibility)
 1983: "Reciprocity of Prose and Poetry" (literature)
 1983: "A Left-Handed Commencement Address" (feminism, social responsibility)
 1983: "Along the Platte" (travel)
 1984: "Whose Lathe?" (literature, social responsibility)
 1984: "The Woman Without Answers" (literature)
 1984: "The Second Report of the Shipwrecked Foreigner to the Kadanh of Derb" (social responsibility)
 1985: "Room 9, Car 1430" (travel)
 1985: "Theodora" (literature)
 1985: "Science Fiction and the Future" (literature, social responsibility)
 1985: "The Only Good Author?" (literature)
 1986: "Bryn Mawr Commencement Address" (feminism, social responsibility)
 1986: "Woman / Wilderness" (feminism, social responsibility)
 1986: "The Carrier Bag Theory of Fiction" (feminism, literature)
 1986: "Heroes" (literature, feminism)
 1986: "Prospects for Women in Writing" (feminism)
 1986: "Text, Silence, Performance" (literature)
 1987: "'Who is Responsible?'" (literature)
 1987: "Conflict" (literature)
 1987: "'Where Do You Get Your Ideas From?'" (literature)
 1988: "Over the Hills and a Great Way Off" (travel)
 1988: "The Fisherwoman's Daughter" (feminism, literature)

Reviews
 1977: "The Dark Tower, C. S. Lewis"
 1978: "Close Encounters, Star Wars, and the Tertium Quid"
 1979: "Shikasta, by Doris Lessing"
 1980: "Two from "Venom""
 1980: "Freddy's Book and Vlemk, by John Gardner"
 1980: "The Marriage Between Zones Three, Four and Five, by Doris Lessing"
 1980: "Kalila and Dimna, retold by Ramsay Wood"
 1980: "Unfinished Business, by Maggie Scarf"
 1980: "Italian Folktales, by Italo Calvino"
 1981: "Peake's Progress, by Mervyn Peake"
 1983: "The Sentimental Agents, by Doris Lessing"
 1984: "Difficult Loves, by Italo Calvino"
 1984: ""Forsaking Kingdoms": Five Poets"
 1985: "The Mythology of North America, by John Bierhorst"
 1986: "Silent Partners, by Eugene Linden"
 1986: "Outside the Gates, by Molly Gloss"
 1986: "Golden Days, by Carolyn See"

Awards and honors
The book was a finalist for the 1990 Hugo Award for Best Non-Fiction Book.

References

1989 non-fiction books
Works by Ursula K. Le Guin
American essay collections
Feminist essays
American non-fiction books
Books of literary criticism
Books of film criticism